Scared Shrekless is a 26-minute computer-animated Halloween horror comedy television special, set shortly after the events of Shrek Forever After, that premiered on the American television network NBC on October 28, 2010. Scared Shrekless was based on the children's book Shrek!, by the writer William Steig, which was published on October 17, 1990.

The special marks the first time outside of the video games that Donkey is now voiced by Dean Edwards since Eddie Murphy declined to return. Rupert Everett and Chris Miller were both replaced by Sean Bishop as Prince Charming and Mister Geppetto respectively while Miles Christopher Bakshi and Nina Zoe Bakshi reprise their roles as Fergus, Farkle, and Felicia from Shrek Forever After. This is also the first time Duloc has been seen since the original Shrek. It was produced with the working title of Shrek or Treat.

Plot
After Fiona and their three children scare away some teenage trick or treaters, Shrek, Donkey, Puss, the Three Little Pigs, the Big Bad Wolf, Gingy, and Pinocchio (after unsuccessfully trying to scare Shrek and his family) decide to tell scary stories. Shrek claims that whoever can tell the scariest story will be crowned King of Halloween. They go to the run down kingdom of Duloc where Lord Farquaad once reigned and get settled inside his abandoned castle and each take turns telling their story.

Scary stories
The Bride of Gingy told by Gingy (a spoof of Bride of Frankenstein)
Boots Motel told by Donkey and Puss (a spoof of Psycho) 
The Shreksorcist told by Shrek (a spoof of The Exorcist)

The Bride of Gingy
Gingy goes to see the Muffin Man and tells him that his girlfriend dumped him because he only thought of himself. So, he and the Muffin Man make a new girlfriend named Sugar. When they make her, Gingy decides to use a lot of sugar, thinking that she will love him forever, despite the Muffin Man's warnings against doing so. When she is baked, Gingy is initially happy with her, but ends up disturbed by her obsession with him.

After running away and pushing her in a big container of batter, he finally becomes free of her, unaware that the batter Sugar was dropped in ended up creating thousands of zombie clones of herself, surrounding Gingy and eating him. The Three Little Pigs get scared and run away and Big Bad Wolf, wearing a witch hat, heads after them on the grounds that they're his ride home. Shrek comments on the falsehood of Gingy's story, saying that he cannot be there if he was eaten, and Gingy runs off as well to hide his embarrassment.

Boots Motel
Next, Donkey and Puss tell a story about them taking shelter from a thunderstorm at the Boots Motel (a parody of the Bates Motel from Psycho). Their story starts off well, but when Donkey tells it, it always end up with Puss getting killed (which irritates Puss to no end), so Puss decides to change it: Donkey and Puss go to the Motel, but Donkey calls Puss his sidekick.

When Puss tries to deny it, Donkey says he took a tongue bath, and gets killed by the innkeeper, but Puss retells it, saying he would fight the innkeeper but the keeper gets knocked over by Donkey, who rescues Puss.

It turns out that the keeper was Prince Charming and he zaps Puss with his wand to dust, but Puss says he used his sword and leaped to safety, but Donkey says he was standing on an 'X' spot, which Charming pulls a lever to trap Puss, but Puss says he would never let that happen to him, so he says that he woke up, revealing to be all a dream. Donkey comes in and tells Puss that he is actually on the ceiling.

The lights go out and when they come back on, Donkey is in the shower and about to be eaten by a giant waffle. Donkey tries to run, but gets covered in butter, wear a pink tutu, a sombrero and a coconut bra. Finally, Donkey gets Pinocchio to spray Puss with water, making him run away. Shrek suspects that this was keep cheating.

The Shreksorcist
At last, Shrek tells the final story about his experience babysitting a crazed and possessed Pinocchio.

After repeatedly beating up Shrek, Pinocchio leaps from the window, despite Shrek's attempts to catch him. When Pinocchio lands on the streets, a talking cricket (Jiminy Cricket) pops out of Pinocchio's head, claiming to be his conscience and the voice in his head that made him go crazy, in which Pinocchio squashes him with his foot in retaliation. Pinocchio denies that the story is true, but when Shrek shows him a normal cricket, he screams and flees in terror. 

Now alone, Shrek and Donkey once again discuss the rumours about Farquaad's ghost, with Shrek recalling that Donkey was involved in Farquaad's death. Suddenly, they hear the wind moving about, and a walking suit of armour calling Donkey's name. It appears to be Farquaad's ghost, who has come to exact revenge. Scared out of his wits, Donkey admits defeat and runs away.

Fiona reveals it was her and the babies who planned the ghost act and then they, along with Shrek, celebrate by egging the Seven Dwarfs.

Cast
 Mike Myers as Shrek
 Dean Edwards as Donkey
 Cameron Diaz as Princess Fiona
 Antonio Banderas as Puss in Boots
 Cody Cameron as Pinocchio and The Three Little Pigs
 Conrad Vernon as Gingerbread Man and Muffin Man
 Christopher Knights as The Three Blind Mice
 Aron Warner as Big Bad Wolf
 Kristen Schaal as Sugar
 Sean Bishop as Geppetto, Prince Charming, Jiminy Cricket, Dwarves, and Waffle
 Miles Christopher Bakshi and Nina Zoe Bakshi as Ogre Babies (Felicia, Farkle and Fergus)
 Louis Gabriel Basso III as Teenager #1
 Devon Werkheiser as Teenager #2 and Teenager #3

Home media
Scared Shrekless got its DVD release on September 13, 2011, along with Monsters vs. Aliens: Mutant Pumpkins from Outer Space. Both releases were accompanied with a new short animated film, titled Thriller Night (after the song by Michael Jackson). and a double DVD release on September 27, 2011, It was released on August 28, 2012, on the Shrek's Thrilling Tales DVD, and the DreamWorks Spooky Stories Blu-ray.

References

External links
 

Shrek mass media
2010 horror films
Halloween television specials
American comedy short films
American horror short films
American comedy horror films
DreamWorks Animation animated short films
NBC television specials
American supernatural horror films
2010s American animated films
2010 comedy horror films
Films directed by Gary Trousdale
Films with screenplays by Gary Trousdale
American films about Halloween
2010s animated television specials
2010 films
American comedy television films
Films about wolves
Films about pigs
Films about cats
Films about donkeys
Films about insects